Martin Albert Coyne (October 20, 1894 – September 18, 1939) was an American Major League Baseball infielder. He played for the Philadelphia Athletics during the  season.

References

Major League Baseball infielders
Philadelphia Athletics players
Baseball players from St. Louis
1894 births
1939 deaths